Magnapop Live at Maxwell's 03/09/2005 is a 2005 live album by Magnapop, released through online music providers including eMusic, the iTunes Store, and Rhapsody.

Track listing
All songs written by Linda Hopper and Ruthie Morris, except where noted
"I Don't Care" – 4:27
"We're Faded" – 2:17
"Smile 4u" – 2:36
"Slowly, Slowly" – 3:40
"Get It Right" – 2:11
"Satellite" – 3:15
"California" – 4:31
"Pretend I'm There" – 3:13
"PDX" – 2:19
"Future Forward" (Hopper, Morris, and Scott Rowe) – 3:22
"Game of Pricks" (Robert Pollard) – 1:59
"Stick to Me" – 2:55
"The In-Between" – 3:57
"Merry" – 3:15
"Open the Door" – 3:49

Personnel
Linda Hopper – lead vocals
Ruthie Morris – guitar, backing vocals
Scott Rowe – bass guitar
Chad Williams – drums

External links
Magnapop Live at Maxwell's 03/09/2005 at Discogs

2005 live albums
Magnapop live albums
Self-released albums